Eutaeniophorus is a genus of flabby whalefish found at depths of from  in the oceans. It is monotypic, being represented by the single species, the festive ribbonfish (Eutaeniophorus festivus) which can grow to a length of  TL.

References
 

Cetomimidae
Monotypic fish genera
Fish described in 1956